Suh Sang-Chul (1935–1983) was a South Korean economist, educator and administrator.

Biography
He was born as a son of the father, Suh Chang-sun who ran a brewery business and the mother, Gwak Bok-sun in Hongseong, South Chungcheong province in 1935. As Suh graduated Seoul High School in 1954, he entered College of Commerce at Seoul National University. In 1955, he went to the United States to study, and finished his undergraduate and graduate studies at the Economics Department of Clark University in Worcester, Massachusetts in 1958 and the following year respectively. Suh focused on studying economic development at Harvard University under the direction of internationally renowned scholar, Simon Kuznets and received his doctorate degree in 1964.

As Suh worked as a professor at Clark University, and at the World Bank, he experiencing a sense of the international economy and educational experience in economics. In 1972, Suh returned to South Korea and worked as a professor at Department of Economy, Korea University. Suh also actively participated in developing economic policies, so he served as a member of Foreign Economic Committee in 1973, Tax System Audit Committee, and a director representative of the South Korean branch of the World Bank.

He served as Vice-Minister of Construction and then was appointed as Minister of Power Resource in 1982. He died in the Rangoon bombing incident in Burma in 1983 in his performance of his duties during an unofficial tour of President Chun Doo-hwan's to Southwest Asia and Oceania. Suh was posthumously awarded an honorary Doctor of Laws by his alma mater Clark University in 1984.

Works
Papers 
경제성장에 관한 한국모형 (trans. Korea Model on Economic Growth), (1975) (in Korean)
남북한의 공업화유형비교 (trans. Comparison of North and South Korea's Industrialization type) (1976) (in Korean)
Books 
A Study of Regional Development in Korea, (1978), Asiatic Research Center, Korea University Press
Growth and Structural Changes in the Korean Economy, 1910∼1940 (1976), Cambridge: Council on East Asian Studies, Harvard University

Awards
Economist Award by Maeil Gyeongje Sinmun in 1975 
Blue Stripes, Order of Service Merit posthumously awarded in 1983

See also
Chung Un-chan
Hyun Song Shin

References

Clark University alumni
Clark University faculty
1935 births
1983 deaths
Seoul National University alumni
Harvard University alumni
People from Hongseong County
Assassinated South Korean politicians
Government ministers of South Korea
People murdered in Myanmar
South Korean terrorism victims
South Korean people murdered abroad
20th-century South Korean economists